was a Japanese bank based in Tokyo and Kobe. It was formed in April 1990 as the Mitsui Taiyo Kobe Bank (MTKB) by the merger of Mitsui Bank (founded 1876) and Taiyo Kobe Bank (founded 1973). The Sakura Bank name was adopted in April 1992.

History
The TKB-Mitsui merger, agreed in 1989 during the height of the Japanese asset price bubble, was to create the second largest bank in the world behind Dai-Ichi Kangyo Bank. While TKB had a large base of individual and small business customers, Mitsui had a complementary base of larger institutional clients. The merger was aimed at leveraging these synergies, as well as providing stronger competition against European banks, which were expected to consolidate following a deregulation in 1992.

Sakura became a major corporate and retail bank in the Greater Tokyo Area during the 1990s and was the largest retail bank in Japan by several measures, including housing loan and investment trust sales.

Sakura incurred massive bad loan write-offs in 1998 and approached one of its major corporate customers, Toyota, for financial support, which was rejected.

Sakura led the consortium that established Japan Net Bank, an online bank, in 2000, and began talks with Sony to establish a second online banking operation in Japan.

Sakura merged with The Sumitomo Bank on April 1, 2001, forming the Sumitomo Mitsui Banking Corporation. The merger was approved in June 2000 and combined Sakura's strong retail operation and eastern Japan presence with Sumitomo's strong wholesale operation and western Japan presence. The merger created the world's third-largest banking group at the time, after Deutsche Bank and the pending merger that would form Mizuho Bank.

Sakura Bank used the SWIFT code "MITKJPJT," derived from the "Mitsui Taiyo Kobe" name.

References

Defunct banks of Japan
Companies formerly listed on the London Stock Exchange
Companies formerly listed on the Tokyo Stock Exchange
Banks disestablished in 2001
Sumitomo Mitsui Financial Group
Financial services companies based in Tokyo
Mitsui
1990 establishments in Japan
Banks established in 1990
Japanese companies disestablished in 2001
Japanese companies established in 1990
2001 mergers and acquisitions